The Brockhamp Islands are two small islands in Laubeuf Fjord, lying  southwest of Mothes Point, Adelaide Island. They were mapped by the Falkland Islands Dependencies Survey (FIDS) from Ronne Antarctic Research Expedition air photos, 1947–48, and FIDS surveys, 1948–50. They were named by the UK Antarctic Place-Names Committee for Bernhard Brockhamp, a German glaciologist who, with H. Mothes, made the first seismic soundings of a glacier, in Austria in 1926.

See also 
 List of Antarctic and sub-Antarctic islands

References 

Islands of Adelaide Island